Liu Dalin, also sometimes Dalin Liu or Ta-lin Liu, (2 June 1932 – 17 December 2022) was a Chinese professor of sociology at Shanghai University who pioneered the field of sexology.

Liu was born on 2 June 1932. From 1989 to 1990, he helped conduct a nationwide survey on sexual behavior and attitudes in China, not unlike the Kinsey Report in the United States. A report on the survey's outcomes was first published in 1992 in Shanghai; in 1997 Liu published the English edition Sexual Behavior in Modern China. Also in 1997, he opened China's first sex museum in Shanghai; it has since moved to Tongli.

Liu won the Magnus Hirschfeld Medal for his research in sexology in 1994.

Liu published several books on the history of erotica in China:

History of Erotica in China (2004), People's Daily Press,  (in Chinese)
Pictorial History of Erotica.
World Sex Culture (2005), China Friendship Press, . (in Chinese)

Liu died on 17 December 2022, at the age of 90.

References

External links
 Interview with Prof. Liu Dalin, 2004
 Home page of his sex museum

1932 births
2022 deaths
Chinese sociologists
Chinese sexologists
People's Republic of China historians
Historians from Shanghai
Scientists from Shanghai
Educators from Shanghai
Yenching University alumni
Academic staff of Shanghai University